Linn County (county code LN) is a county located in east-central Kansas and is part of the Kansas City metropolitan area. As of the 2020 census, the county population was 9,591. Its county seat is Mound City, and its most populous city is Pleasanton. The county was named for Lewis F. Linn, a U.S. Senator from Missouri.

History

Early history

For many millennia, the Great Plains of North America was inhabited by nomadic Native Americans.  From the 16th century to 18th century, the Kingdom of France claimed ownership of large parts of North America.  In 1762, after the French and Indian War, France secretly ceded New France to Spain, per the Treaty of Fontainebleau.

19th century
In 1802, Spain returned most of the land to France, but keeping title to about 7,500 square miles.  In 1803, most of the land for modern day Kansas was acquired by the United States from France as part of the 828,000 square mile Louisiana Purchase for 2.83 cents per acre.

Explorers in the early 19th century came across abandoned mining sites along a creek south of the Marais des Cygnes river. The background of these early miners remains a mystery; but, it inspired early residents of the region to name this waterway "Mine Creek."

Geography

Adjacent counties
 Miami County (north)
 Bates County, Missouri (east)
 Vernon County, Missouri (southeast)
 Bourbon County (south)
 Allen County (southwest)
 Anderson County (west)
 Franklin County (northwest)

National protected area
 Marais des Cygnes National Wildlife Refuge

Demographics

Linn County is included in the Kansas City, MO-KS Metropolitan Statistical Area.

As of the 2000 census, there were 9,570 people, 3,807 households, and 2,748 families residing in the county.  The population density was 16 people per square mile (6/km2).  There were 4,720 housing units at an average density of 8 per square mile (3/km2).  The racial makeup of the county was 97.50% White, 0.63% Black or African American, 0.48% Native American, 0.14% Asian, 0.04% Pacific Islander, 0.16% from other races, and 1.06% from two or more races. Hispanic or Latino of any race were 0.91% of the population.

There were 3,807 households, out of which 28.90% had children under the age of 18 living with them, 62.70% were married couples living together, 6.20% had a female householder with no husband present, and 27.80% were non-families. 24.00% of all households were made up of individuals, and 13.00% had someone living alone who was 65 years of age or older.  The average household size was 2.48 and the average family size was 2.94.

In the county, the population was spread out, with 25.00% under the age of 18, 6.70% from 18 to 24, 24.30% from 25 to 44, 25.70% from 45 to 64, and 18.30% who were 65 years of age or older.  The median age was 41 years. For every 100 females there were 100.00 males.  For every 100 females age 18 and over, there were 97.60 males.

The median income for a household in the county was $35,906, and the median income for a family was $42,571. Males had a median income of $31,720 versus $22,287 for females. The per capita income for the county was $17,009.  About 7.80% of families and 11.00% of the population were below the poverty line, including 14.20% of those under age 18 and 9.60% of those age 65 or over.

Government

Presidential elections

Laws
Following amendment to the Kansas Constitution in 1986, the county remained a prohibition, or "dry", county until 2004, when voters approved the sale of alcoholic liquor by the individual drink with a 30 percent food sales requirement.

Education

Unified school districts
 Pleasanton USD 344
 Jayhawk USD 346
 Prairie View USD 362

Communities

Cities
 Blue Mound
 La Cygne
 Linn Valley
 Mound City
 Parker
 Pleasanton
 Prescott

Unincorporated communities
 Cadmus
 Centerville
 Critzer
 Farlinville
 Mantey
 Trading Post

Townships
Linn County is divided into eleven townships.  None of the cities within the county are considered governmentally independent, and all figures for the townships include those of the cities.  In the following table, the population center is the largest city (or cities) included in that township's population total, if it is of a significant size.

See also
 National Register of Historic Places listings in Linn County, Kansas
 USS Linn County (LST-900)

References

Notes

Further reading

 Plat Book of Linn County, Kansas; North West Publishing Co; 44 pages; 1906.

External links

County
 
 Linn County - Directory of Public Officials
Other
 Linn County News (local newspaper)
Maps
 Marion County Maps: Current, Historic, KDOT
 Kansas Highway Maps: Current, Historic, KDOT
 Kansas Railroad Maps: Current, 1996, 1915, KDOT and Kansas Historical Society

 
Kansas counties
1867 establishments in Kansas
Populated places established in 1867